Haroon Rasheed (3 July 1962 – 8 February 2021) was a Pakistani cricketer. He played thirty-two first-class and two List A cricket matches between 1980/81 and 1987/88 for Lahore and Pakistan Railways cricket teams.

He died on 8 February 2021 at the age of 58 due to a stress-related illness.

References

1955 births
2021 deaths
Lahore cricketers
Pakistan Railways cricketers
Cricketers from Lahore
Pakistani cricketers